This is a list of notable events in country music that took place in the year 1955.

Events
 January 22 — Ozark Jubilee debuts on ABC-TV, the first popular country music show on network TV. It would run through September 1960.
 July 15 — Slim Whitman's "Rose Marie" becomes an international smash, debuting on the British charts and quickly rising to No. 1; its 11-week run will stand as one of the longest runs for many years.
 July 27 — Billboard magazine claims that Webb Pierce is one of only two singing stars that "can be considered guaranteed hitmakers these days"; pop and R&B singer Nat King Cole is the other.
 November 12 — Elvis Presley is voted the most promising country and western artist, according to Billboard magazine's annual disc jockey poll.

No dates
 1955 was one of the most prolific years for new artists, many of whom would revolutionize country music. Some of the more prominent names were Johnny Cash, George Jones, Elvis Presley and Porter Wagoner; it was also the year one of the best-known duos ever — the Louvin Brothers (Charlie and Ira) — would join the Grand Ole Opry. Many of them would go on to record and popularize the best known songs in the genre, and have recording careers that lasted for decades. It would be more than 30 years before another gifted group this prominent would rise to fame and create a revolution in country music in a single year.

Top hits of the year

Number-one hits

United States
(as certified by Billboard)

Notes
1^ No. 1 song of the year, as determined by Billboard.
2^ Song dropped from No. 1 and later returned to top spot.
A^ First Billboard No. 1 hit for that artist.

Note: Several songs were simultaneous No. 1 hits on the separate "Most Played in Juke Boxes," "Most Played by Jockeys" and "Best Sellers in Stores" charts.

Other major hits

Top new album releases

Births
 March 11 — Jimmy Fortune, songwriter and member of The Statler Brothers (he sang tenor).
 March 17 — Paul Overstreet, singer-songwriter who penned hit singles for artists such as Randy Travis and Tanya Tucker, and also had a career as a recording artist as well.
 March 26 — Dean Dillon, songwriter whose works were instrumental in the new traditionalist movement of the 1980s.
 March 28 — Reba McEntire, singer and actress who has enjoyed fame since the early 1980s.
 May 11 — Mark Herndon, drummer with Alabama.
 May 12 — Kix Brooks, half of Brooks & Dunn; host of radio's American Country Countdown.
 May 23 — Garry Koehler, Australian country musician and songwriter (died 2019).
 May 24 — Rosanne Cash, daughter of Johnny Cash; rose to fame in the early 1980s for her "alternative country" style.
 July 1 — Keith Whitley, honky tonk-styled singer of the 1980s (died 1989).
 September 24 — Lane Brody, female vocalist best known for dueting with Johnny Lee on 1984's "The Yellow Rose".
 November 1 — Keith Stegall, record producer who enjoyed a string of hits in the mid-1980s.

Deaths

References

Further reading
Kingsbury, Paul, "Vinyl Hayride: Country Music Album Covers 1947–1989," Country Music Foundation, 2003
Millard, Bob, "Country Music: 70 Years of America's Favorite Music," HarperCollins, New York, 1993
Whitburn, Joel. "Top Country Songs 1944–2005 – 6th Edition." 2005.

Country
Country music by year